The Book of Helaman is one of the books that make up the Book of Mormon. The book continues the history of the Nephites and the Lamanites "according to the records of Helaman, who was the son of Helaman, and also according to the records of his sons, even down to the coming of Christ" (The Book of Helaman, preface). According to footnotes, the book covers the time period between c. 52 BC and 1 BC. Helaman consists of sixteen chapters.

Narrative 
In 52 BC, the Nephites had trouble over the succession to Pahoran as judge among his sons. Out of his many sons, Pahoran Jr., Paanchi, and Pacumeni wanted the seat. They stirred up trouble among the people as they campaigned for the position. The people selected Pahoran Jr. by acclaim, and Pacumeni assented.

But Paanchi had the backing of the minority and he sought to start a rebellion. Before he could make much headway, he was arrested and convicted of sedition, being sentenced to death. The minority sent an assassin named Kishkumen to kill Pahoran. The assassination was done in disguise so no one could accuse Kishkumen.

Men loyal to Pahoran gave chase, but Kiskkumen evaded them and returned to the minority. They all swore to God never to utter a word that Kishkumen had murdered Pahoran. Still, some of the conspirators were found and sentenced to death.  Pacumeni was elevated to Judge in place of Pahoran.

In 51 BC, the Lamanites came against the Nephites with an army led by a man named Coriantumr. He was dispatched by Tubaloth, king of the Lamanites. The political turmoil surrounding the succession of Pahoran caused the city of Zarahemla to drop its guard. Coriantumr killed the guards at the gates, marched inside with his army, killed all who opposed them, and took possession of the city. Pacumeni was killed by Coriantumr against the walls of Zarahemla.

Coriantumr prepared the second phase of his campaign against the land of Zarahemla. His next goal was the city of Bountiful in the north. The Nephites in the countryside were not able to assemble themselves into a large enough force to oppose the Lamanites, so they were defeated.

But Moronihah had removed the bulk of the Nephite forces to the border regions, forming a hard crust while leaving the heart of the land largely undefended. Coriantumr was misled by the relative ease of his drive. After learning of the fall of Zarahemla, Moroniahah dispatched Lehi with an army to intercept the Lamanites before they came to Bountiful. In the great battle that followed, even Coriantumr was slain.

When the Lamanites found themselves surrounded on every side by Nephites, and their leader is slain, they surrendered. Moronihah re-occupied Zarahemla and allowed the captured Lamanite soldiers to depart the land in peace.

See also

Aminadab in the Book of Helaman

Notes

External links

 Story of the Book of Mormon - Helaman: An educational summary of this book

Helaman